This is a list of notable Algerian writers:

A 
Ferhat Abbas (1899–1985), political leader and essayist
Mohamed Aïchaoui (1921–1959), political leader and journalist
Salim Aïssa, pseudonym of Boukella, writer of detective fiction
Wasini al-A'raj (1954– ), novelist and short story writer
Atif Ali (1984– )
Abdelkader Alloula (1939–1994)
Abderrazak Belagrouz (1981– ), writer and scholar
Malek Alloula (1937–2015), poet and critic
Djamal Amrani (1935–2005), poet and essayist
Jean Amrouche (1907–1962), poet
Marguerite Taos Amrouche (1913–1976), writer and singer
Leila Aouchal (1937–2013), novelist
Apuleius (c. 124 – after 170)
Mohammed Arkoun (1928–2010) 
Maya Arriz Tamza (1957– ), storyteller, novelist and playwright
Augustine of Hippo (354–430)
Zighen Aym (1957– )

B 

Fatima Bakhaï (1949– )
Azouz Begag (1957– ), social scientist and novelist
Rabah Belamri (1946–1995), poet, short story writer and critic
Farida Belghoul (1958– )
Omar Belhouchet (1954– )
Myriam Ben (1928–2001), novelist, poet and activist
'Abdelhamid Ben Hadouga (1928–1996), novelist and short story writer
Latifa Ben Mansour (1950– ), writer and linguist
Mohammed Benchicou (1952– )
Salah Benlabed (1950– )
Malek Bennabi (1905–1973)
Jacqueline Benslimane, poet
Réda Bensmaia, novelist and critic
Albert Bensoussan, novelist, translator and academic
Fatiha Berezak, poet and performer
Yve-Alain Bois (1952– )
Aïcha Bouabaci, poet and short story writer
Rachid Boudjedra (1941– ), writer and educator
Nina Bouraoui (1967– ), novelist
Hocine Bouzaher (1935– ), poet, politician and editor

C 
Albert Camus (1913–1960)
Martianus Capella (410–420 CE)
Mehdi Charef (1952– )
Mohamed Cherak (1977–2018), journalist
Corinne Chevallier (1935– )
Hélène Cixous (1937– ), feminist writer and critic

D 
, wrote the first play in Arabic (in 1847)
Kamel Daoud (1970– ), journalist and writer
Djamila Debèche (1926–2010), novelist and essayist
Jacques Derrida (1930–2004), philosopher
Mohammed Dib (1920–2003), novelist and poet 
Tahar Djaout (1954–1993), journalist, poet and fiction writer
Assia Djebar (1936–2015), Francophone writer, film-maker and academic

F 

Nabile Farès (1940–2016)
Fadhila El Farouk (1967– )
Achour Fenni, poet and academic
Mouloud Feraoun (1913–1962)
Omar Fetmouche (1955– ), artist
Touati Fettouma (1950– ), Francophone novelist of the Maghreb
Catherine Filloux

G 

Fatima Gallaire (1944– ), playwright
Salima Ghezali (1958– )
François Giuliani (1938–2009)
Anna Greki, pseudonym of Colette Anna Grégoire (1931–1966), poet
Faïza Guène (1985– )

H 
Malek Haddad (1927–1978), novelist and poet
Mohamed Harbi (1933– )
Mohamed Hassaïne (1945–1994), journalist

K 

Yasmina Khadra (1955– )
Aïssa Khelladi

L 

Djanet Lachmet
Aicha Lemsine (1942– ), novelist

M 
Ahmed Mahsas (1923–2013), political leader and sociologist
Mouloud Mammeri (1917–1989), Kabyle writer, anthropologist and linguist
Leïla Marouane (1960– )
Fodil Mezali (1959– ), journalist and writer
Hocine Mezali (1938– ), journalist and writer
Rachid Mimouni (1945–1995), writer, teacher and activist
Mohamed Missouri (1947–2015), writer, boxer and coach
Ahmed Mohammed al-Maqqari (1578–1632)
Si Mohand (1848–1905)
Malika Mokeddem (1949– )
Ahlam Mostaghanemi (1953– ), novelist

O 
Mohammed Ould Cheikh (1905–1938), poet and novelist

R 
Pierre Rabhi (1938–2021)
Nabila Ramdani
Leila Rezzoug (1956– ), novelist
Emmanuel Roblès (1914–1995)

S 
Boualem Sansal (1949– ) novelist
Leïla Sebbar (1941– ), novelist
Jean Sénac (1926–1962), poet
Othmane Senadjki (1959–2010), journalist
Benjamin Stora (1950– )

T 
Wassyla Tamzali (1941– )
Habib Tengour (1947– )
Kahina Temzi (2003– )

W 
al-Tāhir Wattar (1936–2010), novelist

Y 
Kateb Yacine (1929–1989), novelist and playwright

Z 

Moufdi Zakaria (1908–1977)
Salem Zenia (1962– )
Mohammed Chaouki Zine (1972– )
Ahmed Zitouni (1949– ), novelist

See also
List of Algerian women writers
List of African writers

References 

Algerian writers
Algerian